German submarine U-431 was a Type VIIC U-boat built for Nazi Germany's Kriegsmarine for service during World War II.
She was laid down on 4 January 1940 by Schichau-Werke in Danzig as yard number 1472, launched on 2 February 1941 and commissioned on 5 April 1941 under Kapitänleutnant Wilhelm Dommes (Knight's Cross).

Design
German Type VIIC submarines were preceded by the shorter Type VIIB submarines. U-431 had a displacement of  when at the surface and  while submerged. She had two shafts and two  propellers.

U-431 was fitted with five  torpedo tubes (four fitted at the bow and one at the stern), fourteen torpedoes, one  SK C/35 naval gun, 220 rounds, and a  C/30 anti-aircraft gun. The boat had a complement of between forty-four and sixty.

Service history
The boat's service began on 5 April 1941 for training as part of the 3rd U-boat Flotilla. Afterwards she transferred to the 29th flotilla operating in the Mediterranean on 1 January 1942. In 16 patrols she sank or damaged 11 ships in total.

Wolfpacks
She took part in one wolfpack, namely:
Brandenburg (15 September – 1 October 1941)

Fate
She was sunk on 21 October 1943 in the Mediterranean off Algiers at position  by depth charges dropped from a RAF Wellington bomber of 179 Squadron, operating out of Gibraltar. All hands were lost.

Summary of raiding history

See also
Mediterranean U-boat Campaign (World War II)
List of Knight's Cross of the Iron Cross recipients

References

Notes

Citations

Bibliography

External links

Ships lost with all hands
German Type VIIC submarines
1941 ships
U-boats commissioned in 1941
U-boats sunk in 1943
U-boats sunk by British aircraft
World War II submarines of Germany
World War II shipwrecks in the Mediterranean Sea
Ships built in Danzig
Maritime incidents in October 1943
Ships built by Schichau